Tamajeq or Tamazheq may refer to:

Air Tamajeq language
Tawallammat Tamajaq language

See also
 Tamasheq language